The 2009–2010 Cyclo-cross Superprestige events and season-long competition took place between 11 October 2009 and 14 February 2010. Eight events were organised and the overall title went to Zdeněk Štybar.

Results

Standings
In each race, the top 15 riders gain points, going from 15 points for the winner decreasing by one point per position to 1 point for the rider finishing in 15th position. In case of ties in the total score of two or more riders, the result of the last race counts as decider. If this is not decisive because two or more riders scored no points, the penultimate race counts, and so on until there is a difference.

See also
 2009–2010 UCI Cyclo-cross World Cup
 2009–2010 Cyclo-cross Gazet van Antwerpen

External links
 Cyclo-cross.info  
 Official website

S
S
Cyclo-cross Superprestige